Roccamare is a village in Tuscany, central Italy, administratively a frazione of the comune of Castiglione della Pescaia, province of Grosseto. At the time of the 2001 census its population amounted to 107.

Geography 
Roccamare is about 25 km from Grosseto and 5 km from Castiglione della Pescaia, and it is situated in the pine forest along the Tyrrhenian coast. The pinewood of Roccamare (Pineta di Roccamare) marks the northern end of the Pineta del Tombolo, an ancient pinewood (18th century) that stretches from Principina a Mare (south) to Rocchette (north).

The village is situated along the Provincial Road which links Castiglione della Pescaia to Follonica.

Main sights 
The seaside village of Roccamare was born as a gated community in the early 1960s on a project by Count Federigo Ginori Conti who conceived, financed and implemented the idea. The originary settlement consisted of two hundred villas designed by architects Ugo Miglietta and Antonio Canali. Other villas were designed by Roberto Monsani, Luigi and Giancarlo Bicocchi. Probably, the most interesting buildings in Roccamare are Villa Bartolini (1958) by Ernesto Nathan Rogers and Villa Settepassi (1966-1986) by Pier Niccolò Berardi.

Notable residents 
 Italo Calvino
 Pietro Citati
 Carlo Fruttero
 Sophia Loren
 Roger Moore
 Carlo Ponti
 Romano Prodi
 Georg Solti
 Giovanni Veronesi
 Siegmund G. Warburg

References

Bibliography 
 Marco Del Francia, Walter Di Salvo. Poetiche wrightiane in Maremma, in "Architetture Grosseto", n. 4-5, Pisa, ETS, 2008, pp. 39–40.

See also 
 Buriano, Castiglione della Pescaia
 Pian d'Alma
 Pian di Rocca
 Punta Ala
 Rocchette
 Tirli
 Vetulonia

Frazioni of Castiglione della Pescaia